Guillermo Daniel Rodríguez Pérez (born 21 March 1984) is a Uruguayan professional footballer who plays as a centre back for Sud América.

He is nicknamed El Pelado (in Italian il Pelato).

Club career

Early career
Rodríguez began his playing career in 2002 with Danubio. After loan spells to Atlas of Mexico and Lens of France he joined Argentine side Independiente in 2006. In 2009, he returned to Uruguay to join Peñarol.

Torino
After considering a return to Uruguay on 4 August 2012, he was purchased on a temporary basis by Torino, with whom he signed a contract for one year with an option for two more. He made his debut granata 21 October 2012 in Palermo, disputing a good game; that ended 0–0. On 26 June 2013 he was officially purchased outright from Peñarol, with a two-year contract.

Verona
On 28 July 2014 he was transferred to Verona.

References

External links
  
 
 
 
 

1984 births
Living people
Uruguayan footballers
Uruguayan expatriate footballers
Uruguay international footballers
Danubio F.C. players
Club Atlético Independiente footballers
Peñarol players
Atlas F.C. footballers
RC Lens players
A.C. Cesena players
Torino F.C. players
Hellas Verona F.C. players
Chiapas F.C. footballers
C.A. Cerro players
Club Universitario de Deportes footballers
Sud América players
Uruguayan Primera División players
Uruguayan Segunda División players
Liga MX players
Argentine Primera División players
Ligue 1 players
Serie A players
Peruvian Primera División players
Uruguay under-20 international footballers
2004 Copa América players
Association football defenders
Uruguayan expatriate sportspeople in Argentina
Uruguayan expatriate sportspeople in France
Uruguayan expatriate sportspeople in Mexico
Uruguayan expatriate sportspeople in Italy
Uruguayan expatriate sportspeople in Peru
Expatriate footballers in Argentina
Expatriate footballers in France
Expatriate footballers in Mexico
Expatriate footballers in Italy
Expatriate footballers in Peru